Willemse is a Dutch patronymic surname (Willem's son), equivalent to English Williams and Williamson. It may refer to:

Ashwin Willemse (born 1981), South African rugby player
 (born 1983), Dutch ice hockey player
Cornelius Willemse (1871-1942), Dutch-born New York policeman
Damian Willemse (born 1992), South African rugby player
Hein Willemse (born 1957), South African literary critic and poet
Herman Willemse (1934–2021), Dutch marathon swimmer
Laurance Willemse (born 1962), South African cricket umpire
Laurien Willemse (born 1962) Dutch field hockey player
Mike Willemse (born 1993), South African rugby player
Nathaniel Willemse (born 1985), South African-born Australian singer and songwriter
Paul Willemse (born 1992), South African rugby player
Stan Willemse (1924-2011), English football defender
Stefan Willemse (born 1992), South African rugby player
Stephanie Willemse (born 1989), Scottish beauty pageant contestant

See also
Willems
Willemsen

References

Dutch-language surnames
Patronymic surnames
Surnames from given names